Nisa may refer to:

Locations
Nısa, a village in Azerbaijan
Nisa (Boeotia), a city of ancient Boeotia, Greece
Nisa (Lycia), an ancient city now in Turkey
Nisa (Megaris), a city of ancient Megaris, Greece
Nisa, Iran, a village in Hormozgan Province, Iran
Nisa, Portugal, a municipality in the district of Portalegre
Nisa, Turkmenistan, an ancient city, first capital of the Parthians
Nisa River (disambiguation), several rivers

Organizations
National Intelligence and Security Agency, of the Federal Republic of Somalia
National Intelligence Security Authority, a defunct agency of the Republic of the Philippines
Nippon Ichi Software, a Japanese video game developer 
NISA Investment Advisors, an American asset management firm 
Nisa (retailer), a British symbol group of small grocery stores
Nisa Aşgabat, a Turkmen football club
Nuclear and Industrial Safety Agency, a defunct agency of the Government of Japan

Sports
National Ice Skating Association, a British sports governing body
National Independent Soccer Association, an American soccer (association football) league
North Imphal Sporting Association, a Manipuri football club in India

Other meanings
An-Nisa, the 4th sura of the Qur'an
Nisa, a synonym of the plant genus Homalium
Nisa, a character in the Hyperdimension Neptunia video series
New individual savings account (New ISA), a British tax-advantaged savings and investment product type
Nippon individual savings account, a Japanese tax-advantaged savings and investment product type
A fictional National Intelligence and Security Agency in the Canadian comedy series InSecurity
Nicola Salerno AKA Nisa (1910-1969), Italian lyricist

See also
Nesa (disambiguation)
NISA (disambiguation)
Nise (disambiguation)
Niza (disambiguation)
Nysa (disambiguation)
Nyssa (disambiguation)